Alex Bogomolov Jr. was the defending champion but decided not to participate.

Jesse Levine won the title, defeating Steve Darcis in the final, 6–4, 6–4.

Seeds

Draw

Finals

Top half

Bottom half

References
 Main Draw
 Qualifying Draw

Challenger of Dallas - Singles
2012 Singles